Li Zaihe (1919–1975) was a People's Republic of China politician. He was born in Fushun County, Sichuan Province. He was Communist Party of China Committee Secretary and governor of Guizhou Province.

1919 births
1975 deaths
People's Republic of China politicians from Sichuan
Chinese Communist Party politicians from Sichuan
Governors of Guizhou
Political office-holders in Guizhou
Politicians from Zigong
People of the Republic of China